Nangla-Maheshwari is a village and a gram panchayat in the Bijnor district of Uttar Pradesh.

Villages in Bijnor district